Gobasi, also known as Gebusi, Gobosi or Nomad, is a Trans–New Guinea language of New Guinea, spoken in the plains east of the Strickland River.

There are different varieties of Gobasi. They are known as the Oibae, Bibo and Honibo dialects.

References

Further reading

External links 
 Rosetta Project: Gobasi Swadesh List

Languages of Western Province (Papua New Guinea)
East Strickland languages